The discography of German girlgroup Queensberry consists of three studio albums and eight singles.

Their debut album was released in Germany on 12 December 2008 and later repackaged as a Deluxe Edition in June 2009. The album reached number six on the German album chart. Queensberry received Gold certification in Germany by the IFPI for 100,000+ copies sold. The album sparked two singles, No Smoke and I Can't Stop Feeling. They have been signed to Warner Music Group in Germany and Buddah Brown Entertainment in America.

The group's second studio album titled "On My Own" was released on 6 November 2009. The first single titled "Too Young" was released on 22 May 2009 in Germany. On 23 October 2009, the group released their second single from the album On My Own Hello (Turn Your Radio On).

Albums

Studio albums

Singles

Other Appearances

Music videos

Tours

Supporting act
 2009: Doll Domination Tour

References

Discographies of German artists